Western Hills is a mountainous region of China.

Western Hills may also refer to:
Western Hills, Cincinnati, a neighborhood
Western Hills Group, a faction of the Chinese Nationalist Party, or KMT
Xishan Society, or Western Hills Society, a faction of the Chinese Communist Party
Western Hills Mall, a shopping mall in metro Birmingham, Alabama

See also
West Hills (disambiguation)
Western Hills High School (disambiguation)